Dead in the Water is a 2002 American crime/thriller feature film written and directed by Gustavo Lipsztein.

Plot
Gloria (Dominique Swain) is the spoiled daughter of a Brazilian businessman who is bankrupt. Her father asks her to take Marcos (Sebastian DeVicente), the son of her father's business partner, out for a swim in the ocean.  She does so, using her father's yacht and accompanied by her boyfriend Danny (Scott Bairstow) and their buddy Jeffrey (Henry Thomas).  Gloria is caught kissing Marcos.  Danny is jealous and throws Marcos in the water with a life preserver. To scare Marcos, he then drives the boat to a distant island.  When they return to where they left him, Marcos has disappeared.  Afraid of the consequences of his possible drowning, they discuss alibis and try to figure a way out of their predicament, first destroying their relationships and then themselves.

Partial cast
 Henry Thomas as Jeff
 Dominique Swain as Gloria
 Scott Bairstow as Danny
 Sebastian DeVicente as Marcos
 José Wilker as Father
 Renata Fronzi as Housekeeper
 Lavínia Vlasak as Brazilian Beauty

Production
The film is a remake of the 1962 Roman Polanski film Nóz w wodzie, and like the Polanski original, was shot on locations in Brazil. Casting was announced in 2000.

Reception
David Nusair wrote that the film was "fairly predictable, but mostly entertaining," and offered that "the performances are fine".  Kevin LaForest felt that the film had the potential to be an enjoyable thriller, but that it was lacking in depth and originality, concluding that it was "too stiff and self-important."  Christopher Null of AMC Filmcritic felt that was well-made and reasonably well-acted, but that its staging being confined to the yacht for 90 minutes became a little tiresome, summarizing "Not a bad time, but not a great movie. It hits and misses, but at least it floats."  Buzz McClain of All Movie Guide wrote that the director's nontraditional style might not work for everyone, especially in consideration of Dominique Swain's performance, but added that there was no question that the film's conclusion will generate conversation and introspection for those who understand it.

Awards and nominations
The film won "Best Cinematography", "Best Director", and received the Grand Jury Prize for "Best Feature Film" at the 2002 New York International Independent Film and Video Festival.

References

External links
 

2002 films
2002 crime thriller films
Films set in Rio de Janeiro (city)
Films shot in Rio de Janeiro (city)
Films scored by Heitor Pereira
American crime thriller films
2000s English-language films
2000s American films